GNAVI is an open-source visual software development environment that is composed of three major portions:  GWindows GUI framework, GNATCOM ActiveX/COM framework, and GWenerator code generator.  The inspiration for GNAVI is Delphi and Visual Basic, where the Pascal-family Ada programming language is utilized as a syntactically-similar substitute for Delphi's Object Pascal.

GNAVI is licensed under the GNAT Modified General Public License, allowing to release binaries without the source code.

One of the goals of the GNAVI community to promote the use of Ada among wider programming audiences by demonstrating that ISO standard Ada (i.e., ISO/IEC 8652) has many of the ease-of-programming qualities that have been attributed to proprietary Object Pascal. GNAVI for Microsoft Windows offers features comparable to Delphi and Visual Basic including the use of Active X controls and the ability to interface with Microsoft's .NET Framework and Sun's Java.  As of 2009, GNAVI was also being ported to Mac OS X, Linux and other Unix-like operating systems.

The GNAVI website had seen no activity or releases for four and a half years, from December 2004 until early 2009, but on 14 March 2009, the community announced that it has resumed development and multiple versions have been released since then.

See also 
 Rapid application development
 GNAT Programming Studio (GPS)
 Gambas
 Lazarus

External links 
 
 

Integrated development environments
Free integrated development environments
Linux integrated development environments
Ada (programming language)